is the debut album by Japanese idol duo Pink Lady, released through Victor Entertainment on January 25, 1977. It contains their first two singles: the title track and "S.O.S.", as well as Japanese-language covers of Bay City Rollers songs.

The album peaked at No. 2 on Oricon's weekly albums chart and sold over 135,000 copies, with the cassette/8-track releases selling an additional 5,000 copies.

Track listing

Charts

References

External links
 
 
 

1976 debut albums
Japanese-language albums
Pink Lady (band) albums
Victor Entertainment albums